Vladimir Krnjinac (Serbian Cyrillic: Владимир Крњинац; born 20 February 1983) is a Serbian professional footballer who plays as a midfielder for OFK Beograd. His father, Slavoljub, was also a footballer who played as a goalkeeper.

Career
Krnjinac played for Obilić and Smederevo in the First League of Serbia and Montenegro, as well as for Napredak Kruševac and Metalac Gornji Milanovac in the Serbian SuperLiga. He also represented Borac Čačak in the 2008–09 UEFA Cup, recording six appearances in the process (including qualifiers).

External links
 Srbijafudbal profile
 OFK Beograd profile
 
 

Association football midfielders
First League of Serbia and Montenegro players
FK Borac Čačak players
FK Metalac Gornji Milanovac players
FK Mladost Lučani players
FK Napredak Kruševac players
FK Obilić players
FK Smederevo players
FK Timok players
OFK Beograd players
Serbian First League players
Serbian footballers
Serbian SuperLiga players
Sportspeople from Kruševac
1983 births
Living people